Le Bal des Voleurs (Thieves' Carnival) is a play written by French playwright Jean Anouilh, first staged at Théâtre des Arts, Paris on 17 August 1938.

Later productions
Thieves' Carnival was presented on the televised series The Play of the Week in 1959.

Awards and nominations 
 1955 Vernon Rice Award for Best Production (Drama Desk Awards)

References

External links

1938 plays
Plays by Jean Anouilh
Drama Desk Award-winning plays
Off-Broadway plays